The LSWR X6 class was a class of express passenger 4-4-0 steam locomotives designed for the London and South Western Railway by William Adams. Ten were constructed at Nine Elms Locomotive Works between 1885 and 1886.

The class were numbered 657–666, and just as the T3 class were a smaller-wheeled version of the X2 class, the X6 class were a smaller-wheeled version of the T6 class. The boiler was identical to that used the T6 class. Some of the engines were subsequently fitted with a Drummond boiler, including No. 658 which was the last Adams 4-4-0 to remain in service.

All passed to the Southern Railway at the grouping in 1923. Withdrawals started in 1933, and by the start of World War II, only six remained. Five were retired during the war, leaving only No. 658, which was withdrawn in December 1946. All were scrapped.

References 

X06
4-4-0 locomotives
Railway locomotives introduced in 1895
Scrapped locomotives
Standard gauge steam locomotives of Great Britain